Gu Xiaodan (born 8 April 1999) is a Chinese para table tennis player. She won one of the bronze medals in the women's individual C4 event at the 2020 Summer Paralympics held in Tokyo, Japan.

References

Living people
1999 births
Chinese female table tennis players
Paralympic table tennis players of China
Paralympic bronze medalists for China
Paralympic medalists in table tennis
Table tennis players at the 2020 Summer Paralympics
Medalists at the 2020 Summer Paralympics
Place of birth missing (living people)